The Draanjik or Black River is a river in eastern Yukon-Koyukuk Census Area, Alaska, United States.  It flows generally northwest  from its source to its mouth on the Black River Slough of the Porcupine River near the city of Fort Yukon. In January 2014, the Alaska Historical Commission voted to rename the river to Draanjik, its Gwich'in name, a decision which later found approval by the Board of Geographic Names.

The local Gwich'in name for the river is "Draanjik," which translates as "Caches Along The River." The river gives its name to the Draanjik Gwich'in of Chalkyitsik.

The river has borne several other names: Big Black River (in order to distinguish it from similarly named streams), Orange Creek, Salmon Fork, Salmon River, Squirrel Creek, and Squirrel River. The Board on Geographic Names officially ruled in favor of "Black River" in 1959.

See also
List of rivers of Alaska

References

Rivers of Alaska
Rivers of Yukon–Koyukuk Census Area, Alaska
Tributaries of the Yukon River
Rivers of Unorganized Borough, Alaska